Robert Harry may refer to:

Robert Harry (MP for Winchelsea) in 1373 and 1382
Robert Harry (MP for Seaford) in 1397 and 1399

See also